William John Otterson   (May 24, 1862 in Pittsburgh, Pennsylvania – September 21, 1940) was a 19th-century Major League Baseball player. He played shortstop in 30 games for the Brooklyn Grays during the 1887 baseball season.

External links
Baseball-Reference page

1862 births
1940 deaths
19th-century baseball players
Baseball players from Pittsburgh
Major League Baseball shortstops
Brooklyn Grays players
Pittsburgh Enterprise players
New Castle Neshannocks players
Hamilton (minor league baseball) players
Oil City (minor league baseball) players
Chattanooga Lookouts players
Bridgeport Giants players
Kalamazoo Kazoos players
Wheeling National Citys players
Wheeling Nailers (baseball) players
Burlington Babies players
Altoona Mountaineers players
Evansville Hoosiers players
Lima Kids players
Mansfield Kids players